Parakunnu is a village in Kanyakumari district, South Tamil Nadu, India. It is one of the modern villages in India.

About

History
Before the independence of India, the area was a thick forest. Fr. James from Belgium played an important role in the history of the village.Fr.James has developed this village with various schemes Parakunnu Palm Mortgage Scheme is one of that.

School
St.James RC High School, is the only school in the village.

Occupation
Major income for the village is rubber. The major occupation of the village is masonry.

Religion
Christianity and Hinduism are the major religions in the village.

Sports
 Kiliyanthattu (கிளியாந்தட்டு)
 Otra onnu (A traditional game played using the ball made of coconut leave).
 Seventy
 Kabadi
 Kachi (Goli)
 Vattu (Girls)
 Cricket

Hospital
Ithayam Mision Hospital, Parakunnu

Ithayam Community Hall
 A community hall where most of the functions like Marriage Receptions, 
Birthday parties and other functions takes place. Currently Barathanatiyam Arangetam 
took place. This Hall is the Sacred Heart church belongings.

Specials
Sacred Heart Church is 1st dravida artitecture catholic church.
The construction of this church is in the way that the pillars inside the church is in the model of the Hindu temple and a tomb at the top of the church which resembles muslim mosque.
The pillars were similar to Dravidian style decorated by bundle of plantains.
This church shows the connection with Dravidian architecture and art.
New Life AG Church
Vanniyoor Munnootti Mangalam Sri Dharma Sastha Temple

Shopping
 Parakunnu is one of the largest shopping center. Here all types of shops are available and a market is there which provides all types of fresh fishes and green vegetables.

References

Villages in Kanyakumari district